Joan Mabel Frederica du Plat Taylor FSA (Glasgow, 26 June 1906 – Cambridge, 21 May 1983) was a British archaeologist and pioneer of underwater nautical archaeology.

Early life and education
Joan Mabel Frederica Du Plat Taylor was born in Glasgow, Scotland on 26 June 1906. Her parents were Colonel St. John Louis Hyde du Plat Taylor and Alice Home-Purves and her grandfather was Colonel John Lowther du Plat Taylor CB VD (1829 – 5 March 1904). She had no formal training, but became one of the first maritime archaeologists. From 1931 until 1939 she was Assistant Curator at the Cyprus Museum. In Cyprus she excavated a Late Bronze Age mining site at Apliki and a temple of the same period in Myrtou-Pigades. Then from 1940 to 1970 she was a librarian at the Institute of Archaeology.

Nautical archaeology

She campaigned to bring nautical archaeology into the academic fold. She co-directed an excavation of an ancient shipwreck at Cape Gelidonya in 1960 alongside George Bass, was instrumental in establishing the Council for Nautical Archaeology in 1964 and was founder editor of the International Journal of Nautical Archaeology (IJNA) from 1972–1980. She also recognised that amateurs could play an important role in archaeology and established systems to educate and encourage them. She was the first president of the Nautical Archaeology Society.

She personally funded a grant to support publication of nautical archaeological research. Since her death, the award has continued to be given by the Nautical Archaeology Society as the Joan du Plat Taylor Award.

Selected publications 

 
 
 
 Taylor, Joan du Plat; (1935). "Hoard of Medieval Coins from Tripoli Bastion", Report of the Department of Antiquities, Cyprus, 22-24.
 
 
 
 Taylor, Joan du Plat (1964). "Motya: A Phoenician Trading Settlement in Sicily". Archaeology. 17 (2): 91-100.

References

External links

Scottish women archaeologists
Scottish archaeologists
1906 births
1983 deaths
Maritime archaeology
Archaeologists from Glasgow
20th-century British women scientists
20th-century British women writers
20th-century archaeologists
Underwater archaeologists